The Memphis Wrestling Hall of Fame was a professional wrestling hall of fame maintained by the United States Wrestling Association. The induction ceremony for the Class of 1994, the inaugural inductees into the Hall of Fame, took place at the USWA's "Monday Night Memories", a tribute show, held at the Mid-South Coliseum on March 7, 1994. Tommy Gilbert, a longtime Memphis wrestler, referee and promoter, led the class, which included wrestlers Sputnik Monroe, Al and Don Greene, commentator Lance Russell, and promoter Jerry Jarrett.

The success of the first "Memphis Memories" show, attended by over 8,300 fans, resulted in Randy Hales being made head booker of the USWA. Ironically, Eddie Gilbert, with much of the event revolving around his feud with Jerry Lawler, was upset at having been passed over for the position and left the promotion within a few weeks.

On June 10, 1995, the Class of 1995 was inducted into the Hall of Fame. Like the previous ceremony, it was held during a wrestling event, Memphis Memories II, at the Mid-South Coliseum. Wrestler Jackie Fargo's induction led the Class of 1995, which consisted of wrestlers "Hot Stuff" Eddie Gilbert, Phil Hickerson, Joe LeDuc, and Billy Wicks. In addition to the inductees, the event featured a special "legends introduction" of Memphis wrestling stars including Corsica Joe, Tommy Gilbert, Gypsy Joe, Jerry Jarrett, Sara Lee, Eddie Marlin, Frank Morell, Buddy Wayne, and Jim White. The 1995 edition was attended by 3,850 fans. Only one inductee, Eddie Gilbert, was inducted posthumously. Overall, there were ten inductees; one commentator, and promoter, and eight wrestlers.

The hall of fame ceased being maintained following the close of the USWA in 1997, however, there have been attempts to revive the idea in recent years. Since 2002, the website KayfabeMemories.com has fan-based voting, similar to the Wrestling Observer Newsletter Hall of Fame, for each of the various "territory-era" promotions, including the Memphis wrestling territory, covered by the website. From 2008 to 2010, the website RasslinRiotOnline.com also presented its own version of the Memphis Wrestling Hall of Fame.

In 2017, the Hall of Fame was reactivated. Since then, they hosted two more ceremonies: one in 2018 and one in 2021. A new website was launched in 2021. Memphiswrestlinghalloffame.com

Inductees

Footnotes
 – Entries without a birth name indicates that the inductee did not perform under a ring name.
 – This section mainly lists the major accomplishments of each inductee in the Memphis wrestling territory.

See also
List of professional wrestling halls of fame

References

Professional wrestling halls of fame
Organizations based in Memphis, Tennessee
Awards established in 1994
Professional wrestling-related lists
1994 establishments in Tennessee